Mysteries of the Unknown is a series of books about the paranormal, published by Time-Life Books from 1987 through 1991. Each book focused on a different topic, such as ghosts, UFOs, psychic powers and dreams. The idea for the series was conceived following the popularity of the publisher's previous Enchanted World book series. The Mysteries of the Unknown series used scientific aspects for credibility of its theories. The books broke the sales record for the company.

Time-Life published a companion series, Collector’s Library of the Unknown, from 1991 through 1993.

Titles in the series
There were 33 volumes in the series:

 01. Mystic Places: Discusses places known for supernatural activity or ancient mysteries yet unsolved. Topics include the search for Atlantis, traveling to the earth's center, the Great Pyramid of Giza, Stonehenge, and the Nazca lines.
 02. Psychic Powers: Discusses ESP and other people who claim to possess psychic abilities. Includes information on Patience Worth and the involvement of psychics in the Yorkshire Ripper case.
 03. The UFO Phenomenon: Discusses sightings and controversies regarding unidentified flying objects. Topics include alien encounters, the Roswell incident, and allegations of government cover-ups.
 04. Psychic Voyages: Discusses accounts of out-of-body experiences, near death experiences, and reincarnation.
 05. Phantom Encounters: Discuses encounters with mysteries apparitions. Includes stories haunted families, banishing ghosts, and various ghost stories from Japan.
 06. Visions and Prophecies
 07. Mysterious Creatures: Discusses cryptozoology, with a focus on sea monsters and ape-men. Topics include Nessie, the Patterson–Gimlin film, Ameranthropoides loysi, and mokele-mbembe.
 08. Mind Over Matter: Deals predominantly with people who possess abilities considered abnormal, though not necessarily supernatural. Discusses hypnosis, poltergeists, levitation and Uri Geller.
 09. Cosmic Connections: Discusses mankind's long curiosity about the influence of celestial bodies. Includes extensive looks at the solar system and the zodiac.
 10. Spirit Summonings: Discusses mediums and seances. Topics include the Fox Sisters, Daniel Dunglas Home, and Harry Houdini's debunking of mediums.
 11. Ancient Wisdom and Secret Sects: Includes details on Hermeticism and secret societies.
 12. Hauntings: Discusses the apparent haunting of people and places by ghosts, as well as ghosting hunting. Includes information on poltergeists, the Moberly–Jourdain incident, ghost ships and the Bell witch.
 13. Powers of Healing: Discusses unexplained alternatives to traditional medicine. Topics include medicine men, Edgar Cayce, acupuncture, Rasputin and chakras.
 14. Search for the Soul
 15. Transformations: Discusses human transformation into animals or other supernatural creatures. Focuses on werewolves and vampires. Topics include tricksters, feral children, Peter Stubbe and Elizabeth Báthory.
 16. Dreams and Dreaming
 17. Witches and Witchcraft
 18. Time and Space: Deals predominantly with the history of human interpretations of time and space, as well as unusual phenomena associated with the two (such as time slips). Quantum physics and Pythagorean mysticism are discussed at length.
 19. Magical Arts
 20. Utopian Visions
 21. Secrets of the Alchemists
 22. Eastern Mysteries
 23. Earth Energies
 24. Cosmic Duality: The concept of duality (good/evil, black/white, male/female) is discussed in depth. Topics include Zoroastrianism, Satanism, conceptions of God and Goddess, demon possession and exorcism.
 25. Mysterious Lands and Peoples
 26. The Mind and Beyond
 27. Mystic Quests
 28. Search for Immortality
 29. The Mystical Year
 30. The Psychics
 31. Alien Encounters: Discusses extraterrestrial encounters and possible abductions.
 32. The Mysterious World
 33. Master Index and Illustrated Symbols

Complete 33-Volume Set: Time Life; Mysteries of the Unknown Hardcover – 1991

Commercials 
Time Life's Mysteries of the Unknown commercials would air during prime time through broadcast and cable television networks such as TNN, Nick At Nite, MTV, VH-1, and TNT.

The first commercial advertising Mysteries of the Unknown aired in September 1987; the voice-over narration started with "Chicago: a man is about to board a routine flight and suddenly he pauses, and walks away. An hour later the plane goes down in flames. It's dismissed as chance." One- and two-minute versions of this commercial were aired.

A second commercial aired in September 1988; the voice-over narration began with: "How can you explain it? A woman in Wisconsin is doing the dishes, while suddenly she has a feeling that her daughter has been just been in an accident. She gets a desperate phone call and finds out her feeling has just become true. How can you explain that various people around the world – who had never met before – had encounters with beings from outer space and their descriptions of the creature match almost exactly (sketch art of grey aliens appear on screen during this narration)? That's why Time Life books presents a remarkable new series, Mysteries of the Unknown, which takes a clear and comprehensive look at our own untapped capabilities. Maybe no one can explain these things but they can no longer be ignored. How can you explain this? Four men enter a ring of trees and without warning one is grabbed by an unseen force, lifted five feet in the air, and suspended for thirty seconds." Images of Stonehenge and a picture of bloody hands on a window are shown.

In 1989, actress Julianne Moore appeared in a Mysteries of the Unknown commercial explaining out of body experiences. The narration describes her waking up in the middle of the night with the feeling of something cold on her shoulder, only to find that she was affixed to the ceiling, looking down at her own body from above.

On New Years Day of 1990, Time-Life aired another commercial for Mysteries of the Unknown in conjunction with TV Guide.

References 

Book series introduced in 1987
Occult books
Books about the paranormal
Time Life book series